Ceres Cafe is a diner in the lobby of the Chicago Board of Trade Building. It takes its name from the Roman goddess Ceres, which is a statue on the top of the building. It has been known as a place for commodities  traders that serves very strong alcoholic beverages.

History
The restaurant began as Broker's Inn in 1967 and then moved to its current location and changed its name in December 1989. In 2019, Chicago Police superintendent Eddie Johnson was found asleep in his car after having “a couple of drinks” at Ceres.

References

Restaurants in Chicago
Chicago Board of Trade
Diners in the United States